Alcovy Mountain is a monadnock in the U.S. state of Georgia similar to Kennesaw Mountain in the city of Marietta. It is located in Walton County four miles south of the city of Monroe.

The terrain around the mountain averages roughly  AMSL. Alcovy (pronunciation: al-CO-vee) Mountain rises steeply from the banks of the Alcovy River, which arises farther north, in Gwinnett County.

History

The name of Alcovy Mountain comes from the river that flows north to south directly west of the mountain. The native Muskogean Indians named the river "Ulcofauchatchie", meaning "a river among the bog potato", otherwise known as the pawpaw tree.  As different accented tongues of European immigrants settled in this area, "Alcovy" later became the name.  Although this river flows for over 50 miles until its confluence as a tributary of the Ocmulgee River, these lowland "bog potato" swamps occur for just less than a dozen miles around the mountain.  Today, like several other low mountains in the area, Alcovy is privately owned and access is prohibited. However, twenty miles West in southeast Atlanta are three other monadnocks that are protected. These mountains have large rock outcrops that have merited their conservation. They are Arabia Mountain, Panola Mountain, and Stone Mountain.

References

Landforms of Walton County, Georgia
Inselbergs of North America
Mountains of Georgia (U.S. state)